The Songs from the Tainted Cherry Tree Tour was a tour of the United Kingdom and Ireland by British singer-songwriter Diana Vickers, promoting her debut album, Songs from the Tainted Cherry Tree. The third leg was as a support act for JLS.

Tour
The first and second leg of Diana Vickers' first headline tour of the UK was in March and May 2010, stopping at small venues across the UK. The third leg was as a support act on several dates for JLS and the fourth leg stopping at major arenas around the UK, Scotland, Wales and Ireland, making it the first time Vickers has toured in Ireland. The tour started on 19 March 2010, and ended on 15 November, with 31 shows, (including supporting JLS). The second leg's support act was Max Tuohy, and the fourth leg's was Spark. The first leg had no support act, as its venues were all small.

Festival appearances during tour
Her tours asides, Vickers appeared at many festivals throughout Summer 2010. Vickers appeared appear at the 2010 V Festival, The Live Lounge Stage at Radio 1's Big Weekend 2010, Stoke Festival, T4 on the Beach, T in the Park, 2010 Oxygen Festival, iTunes Festival, 2010 Sundae Festival and 2010 Freedom Festival, promoting her debut album. Vickers also supported Mika at the Eden Sessions in 2010. On the tour dates, Vickers dates as a support act towards JLS have been added in.

Tour dates

Setlist
Leg 1: Headline
"The Boy Who Murdered Love"
"Remake Me and You"
"N.U.M.B"
"Put It Back Together"
"Four Leaf Clover"
"Once"
"My Hip"
"Just Say Yes" (Snow Patrol cover)
"Notice"
"Jumping into Rivers"
Leg 2: Headline
"The Boy Who Murdered Love"
"Jumping into Rivers"
"Remake Me and You"
"N.U.M.B"
"Four Leaf Clover"
"Put It Back Together"
"Just Say Yes" (Snow Patrol cover)
"My Hip"
"Once"
"Notice"
 Note: "You'll Never Get to Heaven" was also played at the Cardiff date of the tour.
Leg 3: (JLS Support) 
"The Boy Who Murdered Love"
"Once"
Leg 4: Headline 
"Remake Me and You"
"You'll Never Get to Heaven"
"Just Say Yes" (Snow Patrol cover)
"Put it Back Together"
"Jumping into Rivers"
"My Hip"
"More Than This"
"The Boy Who Murdered Love"
"Four Leaf Clover"
"Notice"
"My Wicked Heart"
"Once"

References 

2010 concert tours